The 2013 V-Varen Nagasaki season is V-Varen Nagasaki's first season in the J. League Division 2 after winning the 2012 Japan Football League and gaining promotion.

Key events
20 December 2012: Takuya Takagi is announced as the new coach of V-Varen Nagasaki. 
3 March: V-Varen Nagasaki play their first ever professional match in the J. League Division 2 against Fagiano Okayama at the Kanko Stadium in which the club drew 1–1. Kōichi Satō scored the club's first goal in the J. League Division 2 in the 25th minute of that match.
10 March: Nagasaki play their first ever Division 2 match at home at the Nagasaki Athletic Stadium in which they took on 2008 AFC Champions League winners Gamba Osaka in front of 18,153 people. 
20 March: V-Varen Nagasaki win their first ever match in Division 2 when they defeated Kataller Toyama at home.

Transfers

In:

Out:

Note: Flags indicate national team as has been defined under FIFA eligibility rules. Players may hold more than one non-FIFA nationality.

J. League Division 2

Results summary

Results by round

Squad

First-team squad

Technical staff

Player statistics

Top Scorers

Disciplinary record

See also
 2013 in Japanese football
 List of V-Varen Nagasaki seasons

References

V-Varen Nagasaki
V-Varen Nagasaki seasons